This is a list of banks in Japan.

Central Bank 
 Bank of Japan

Governmental institutions

Existing National Institutions
 Development Bank of Japan, or DBJ 
 Japan Finance Corporation, or JFC 
 Japan Bank for International Cooperation, or JBIC , the internal division of Japan Finance Corporation.
 Okinawa Development Finance Corporation 
 Shoko Chukin Bank 
 Japan Housing Finance Agency

Postal Savings Bank
Japan Post Bank, former Japan Post's banking division and subsidiary of the successor Japan Post Holding.

Regional Municipalities', Authorities' Mutual Corporation
Japan Finance Organization for Municipalities , restructured to Japan Finance Organization for Municipalities.

Defunct National Institutions
 Agriculture Forestry and Fisheries Finance Corporation , merged to Japan Finance Corporation.
 Japan Finance Corporation for Small and Medium Enterprise , merged to Japan Finance Corporation.
 National Life Finance Corporation , merged to Japan Finance Corporation.
 Japan Post , restructured to Japan Post Bank.
 Japan Finance Corporation for Municipal Enterprises

Megabanks 

 Mitsubishi UFJ Financial Group
 The Bank of Tokyo-Mitsubishi UFJ
 Mitsubishi UFJ Trust and Banking Corporation
 The Senshū Bank
 The Master Trust Bank of Japan
 Sumitomo Mitsui Financial Group
 Sumitomo Mitsui Banking Corporation
 Mizuho Financial Group
 Mizuho Bank
 Mizuho Trust & Banking Co.
 Chiba Kōgyō Bank
 Trust & Custody Services Bank

Money center banks 
 Sumitomo Mitsui Trust Holdings
 Sumitomo Trust and Banking
 The Chuo Mitsui Trust and Banking Co.
 Mitsui Asset Trust and Banking Co.
 Resona Holdings
 Resona Bank
 Saitama Resona Bank
 Kinki Osaka Bank
 Resona Trust & Banking Co.
 Aozora Bank, former Nippon Credit Bank
 Aozora Trust Bank
 Shinsei Bank, former Long-Term Credit Bank of Japan
 Shinsei Trust & Banking Co.

Trust banks 
 Mitsubishi UFJ Trust and Banking Corporation (subsidiary of Mitsubishi UFJ Financial Group)
 Mizuho Trust & Banking Co. (subsidiary of Mizuho Financial Group)
 Sumitomo Mitsui Trust Holdings
 Sumitomo Trust and Banking
 The Chuo Mitsui Trust and Banking Co.
 Mitsui Asset Trust and Banking Co.
 The Master Trust Bank of Japan (subsidiary of Mitsubishi UFJ Financial Group)
 The Nomura Trust & Banking Co. (subsidiary of Nomura Holdings)
 NikkoCiti Trust and Banking (joint venture of Nikko Cordial and Citigroup)
 ORIX Trust and Banking (subsidiary of ORIX)
 Shinkin Trust Bank (subsidiary of Shinkin Central Bank)
 Aozora Trust Bank (subsidiary of Aozora Bank)
 Nōrinchūkin Trust and Banking (subsidiari of Norinchukin Bank)
 Shinsei Trust & Banking Co. (subsidiary of Shinsei Bank)
 JSF Trust and Banking Co. (subsidiary of Japan Securities Finance Co.)
 ShinGinkō Tokyo (subsidiary of Tokyo Metropolitan Government)
 Japan Trustee Services Bank (joint venture of Resona Holdings and Sumitomo Mitsui Trust Holdings)
 Trust & Custody Services Bank (subsidiary of Mizuho Financial Group)
 Resona Trust & Banking Co. (subsidiary of Resona Holdings)

Foreign banks

Members of the International Bankers Association in Japan

Financial Groups 

 Australia and New Zealand Banking Group Limited
 Bank of America Merrill Lynch
 Barclays Bank Group
 BNP Paribas
 Citigroup
 Crédit Agricole Group
 Credit Suisse Group
 DBS Bank Ltd
 Deutsche Bank Group
 Goldman Sachs Japan Co., Ltd.
 HSBC Group Japan
 JPMorgan Chase
 National Australia Bank Group
 Royal Bank of Canada
 Société Générale
 Standard Chartered Bank
 The Bank of New York Mellon
 UBS AG
 Wells Fargo

Commercial Banks
 Australia and New Zealand Banking Group
 Banco Bilbao Vizcaya Argentaria
 Banco do Brasil S.A.
 Bangkok Bank
 Bank of Communications
 Bank of India
 China Construction Bank
 Chinatrust Commercial Bank
 Commerzbank
 Commonwealth Bank of Australia
 DBS Bank
 Depfa Bank
 ING Bank
 Itaú Unibanco
 Korea Exchange Bank
 Lloyds Bank plc
 Metropolitan Bank and Trust Company
 National Australia Bank
 Oversea-Chinese Banking Corporation
 Philippine National Bank
 Bank Negara Indonesia
 Rabobank Nederland
 Standard Chartered Bank
 State Bank of India
 The Bank of Nova Scotia
 UniCredit
 Union de Banques Arabes et Françaises
 United Overseas Bank
 Wells Fargo Bank, N.A.
 WestLB AG

Representative Offices
 Banco Santander
 CIC Banks
 Crédit Foncier
 Euroclear Bank
 Landesbank Baden-Württemberg
 Caixa Economica Federal

Other

 Banco Itaú
 Bank Muamalat Malaysia
 Bank of China
 Bank of Hawaii
 Bank of New Zealand
 Bank of Taiwan
 BayernLB
 Canadian Imperial Bank of Commerce
 Chang Hwa Bank
 First Commercial Bank
 Habib Metropolitan Bank
 Hana Financial Group
 Industrial and Commercial Bank of China
 Kiup Bank
 Kookmin Bank
 Korea Development Bank
 Korea Exchange Bank
 Mega International Commercial Bank
 SC First Bank
 Shinhan Bank
 Union Bank of California
 Westpac
 Woori Bank

Community banking system 
 Shinkin Banks
 Shinkin Central Bank
 Shinkin Trust Bank
 Shinkumis
 Labour Banks
 JA Banks
 Nōrinchūkin Bank
 Nōrinchūkin Trust and Banking

M&A Tree 
Japan's banking system has consolidated dramatically since the 1990s.  The list below gives an account of the banking industry's composition and consolidation.
Mizuho Financial Group (2000) / Mizuho Bank / Mizuho Corporate Bank (2002)
Dai-Ichi Kangyō Bank (1971)
Dai-Ichi Bank
Nippon Kangyō Bank
Fuji Bank
Industrial Bank of Japan
Mitsubishi UFJ Financial Group (2005) / The Bank of Tokyo-Mitsubishi UFJ (2006)
Mitsubishi Tokyo Financial Group (2001) / The Bank of Tokyo-Mitsubishi (1996)
The Bank of Tokyo
Mitsubishi Bank
UFJ Holdings / UFJ Bank (2002)
Sanwa Bank (1933)
Sanjūyon Bank
Yamaguchi Bank
Kōnoike Bank
Tōkai Bank (1941)
Aichi Bank
Nagoya Bank
Itō Bank
Sumitomo Mitsui Banking Corporation (2002)
The Sumitomo Bank
Sakura Bank (1990)
Mitsui Bank
Taiyō-Kobe Bank (1973)
Taiyō Bank
Bank of Kobe
Resona Holdings / Resona Bank / Saitama Resona Bank (2002)
Asahi Bank (1991)
Kyōwa Bank
Saitama Bank
Daiwa Bank
 Mitsui Trust Holdings (2002) / The Chūō Mitsui Trust and Banking Co. (2000)
 The Chūō Trust and Banking Co.
 Mitsui Trust and Banking Co.

Bankruptcy 
Hokkaidō Takushoku Bank, absorbed into North Pacific Bank and The Chūō Mitsui Trust and Banking Co. (1998)

See also 
 List of financial regulatory authorities by country

References

 Lists
Japan
Banking in Japan
banks
Japan